Jirásek (feminine Jirásková) is a Czech surname derived from the given name Jiří. The German language form is Jirasek. Notable people with the surname include:

 Alois Jirásek, Czech writer, author of historical novels and plays
 František Jirásek, Czech footballer
 Jindřich Jirásek, Czech footballer
 Jiřina Jirásková, Czech actress
 Ladislav Jirásek, Czech-German footballer
 Markéta Jirásková, Czech orienteer
 Milan Jirásek, Czech footballer
 Vladimír Jirásek, Czechoslovak slalom canoer

Czech-language surnames